Schistura jarutanini is a species of troglobitic stone loach endemic to Thailand.

Sources
 

J
Fish of Southeast Asia
Fish of Thailand
Cave fish
Fish described in 1990
Taxonomy articles created by Polbot